Attagirl is a Philippine primetime weekly sitcom that aired on ABS-CBN from September 13, 2001, to May 7, 2002, and was replaced by OK Fine, 'To Ang Gusto Nyo!.

This is also the second time Jose Javier Reyes collaborated with Jessa Zaragoza

Synopsis
After the success of Whattamen Attagirl the second series of Jose Javier Reyes follows on 4 different women and there relationships Amanda (Jessa Zaragoza) the serious one Vanessa Del Blanco and Michelle Bayle are cousins who live with there Lolo and ( Andrea del Rosario) a sexy house boarder will they get there chance and luck at love and life? as they navigate the hot city of Manila  With all the craziness in the 2000s? In this comedy sitcom series

Cast
Vanessa Del Bianco as Maxi
Andrea del Rosario as Jhoanne Mae
Desiree del Valle as Charly
Jessa Zaragoza as Amanda
Michelle Bayle as Geri

See also
List of programs broadcast by ABS-CBN

ABS-CBN original programming
Philippine television sitcoms
2001 Philippine television series debuts
2002 Philippine television series endings
Filipino-language television shows